The SASTRA Ramanujan Prize, founded by Shanmugha Arts, Science, Technology & Research Academy (SASTRA) located near Kumbakonam, India, Srinivasa Ramanujan's hometown, is awarded every year to a young mathematician judged to have done outstanding work in Ramanujan's fields of interest.  The age limit for the prize has been set at 32 (the age at which Ramanujan died), and the current award is $10,000.

Winners
An F symbol denotes mathematicians who later earned a Fields Medal.

See also
 ICTP Ramanujan Prize
 List of mathematics awards

References

External links
 SASTRA Ramanujan Prize

Mathematics awards
Awards established in 2005
Indian science and technology awards
Srinivasa Ramanujan
2005 establishments in Tamil Nadu